The Dahabeya or Dahabiya is a sailing boat that is based out of Luxor, Esna or Aswan for 3, 7, 9 or 12 nights cruises on the Nile river.

History
Originally built to carry celebrities and royal families, the Dahabeya was a luxury pleasure boat for the Nile. The name means "golden one", alluding to its gold and dongola decoration. (ذهبىة /ðahabīya/ is the feminine of ذهبى /ðahabī/ "golden". In Arabic the feminine suffix -a can indicate the singulative of inanimates, changing the meaning from "golden" to "a single golden thing". This word is used in Egypt for a general type of Nile boat: see dahabeah.)

The name came to be applied to other boats with similar luxuries. The Dahabeya was later refitted as a cruise ship and now cruises the Nile River and Lake Nasser. Today many newer Dahabeyas have been built for luxury cruises.

Specifications
Specifications of the Dahabeya are:
Length: 34,5 m 
Draught: 0.6 m  
Main Mast: 12.5 m  
Sail: 360 sq. m

References

See also
Dahabeah
Sailing

Passenger ships of Egypt